Ekhoni Somoy (English: It is the time) is a 1980 Bangladeshi film starring Bobita and Ujjal. Abdullah Al Mamun garnered Bangladesh National Film Award for Best Director for the film.

Music 
Sheikh Saadi Khan composed score where Sabina Yasmin lent her voice to the songs.

Awards 
Bangladesh National Film Awards
 Best Director - Abdullah Al Mamun

References

1980 films
Bengali-language Bangladeshi films
Films scored by Sheikh Sadi Khan
1980s Bengali-language films